Paul Garnault is a Welsh actor, director and educationalist. He is currently  a Director at the Ruskin Mill Trust UK. He is a Director of Tir Ceridwen Land Trust (2019). He has also spent over 20 years in Further Education management and as a lecturer in Performing Arts and Media Production. He is Artistic Director for Wales Actors’ Company. He is also a Director for Trigonos, North Wales.(June 2019).

Training
Trained at Powys-Brecon: Ysgol Uwchradd Aberhonddu.
Trained at London: East 15 Acting School.
Trained at University of Wales. Post Graduate Certificate of Education (level 6)

Directorial Accomplishments

Wales Actors' Company

1998 Twelfth Night 
1999 Hamlet 
2000 Henry V 
2001 Romeo and Juliet 
2001 Macbeth 
2002 Midsummer Night's Dream 
2002 The Rover Aphra Behn 
2003 Dr Faustus by Christopher Marlowe 
2003 The Tempest 
2004 Much Ado About Nothing
2015/19 Pope Head, Secret Life of Frances Bacon

Career
He has worked as an actor, director and lecturer in Performing Arts in many parts of the UK and Europe.

Acting
International Theatre Institute
Royal Shakespeare Company
 Made In Wales Theatre
 Wales Actors' Company
Sherman Theatre Company Cardiff
 Stadte Theater Erlangen Germany

BBC Television Credits
Private Life of a Masterpiece
EastEnders
Oustside The Rules

Professional
 2019 : Director of Development Wales and Performing Arts. Ruskin Mill Trust
 2016-18: Principal Ruskin Mill College, Stroud.
 2015-18: Principal Coleg Plas Dwbl, Wales
 2010: Head of the Academy for Performing Arts, Birmingham Metropolitan.
Also worked at University of Cardiff, Merthyr Tydfil College (9 years) Coleg Gwent, Gloucestershire College, Kidderminster College.
A founder of the Wales Actors' Company and Artistic Director for twenty years  (The Company works in the Theatre Workshop style of Joan Littlewood and has been called "without doubt one of the most successful professional theatre companies in Wales".)
2006/7 Arts Council Of Wales, South Wales Committee.

References

External links
Paul Garnault's Blog

 paulgarnault.com

Welsh male television actors
Welsh theatre directors
1961 births
Living people
Alumni of East 15 Acting School